This is a list of notable Estonian-Americans, including both original immigrants who obtained American citizenship and their American descendants. 

To be included in this list, the person must have a Wikipedia article showing they are Estonian American or must have references showing they are Estonian American and are notable.

Arts and literature
Alar Kivilo (born 1953) — member of the Academy of Motion Picture Arts and Sciences, cinematographer
Lisa Kivirist (born 1967) — author
Kristjan Järvi (born 1972) — symphony conductor
Neeme Järvi (born 1937) — symphony conductor. Moved to the US in 1981
Paavo Järvi (born 1962) — current Music Director of the Cincinnati Symphony Orchestra
Tõnu Kalam (born 1948) — pianist and symphony conductor
Mark Kostabi (born 1960) — artist
Paul Kostabi (born 1962) — artist, music producer
Louis Kahn (1901–1974) — architect, designer of the Salk Institute, Kimbell Art Museum, and others
Ilse Lehiste (1922–2010) — linguist and author
Alexander Nelke (1894–1974) — artist
Dennis Nurkse (born 1949) — poet
Raymond Pettibon (born 1957) — artist, designer of the iconic Black Flag (band) bars
Bill Rebane (born 1937) — film director
Ene Riisna (born 1938) — television producer
Jerry Saltz (Estonian father) (born 1951) — art critic
Helen Tobias-Duesberg (1919–2010) — composer
Priit Vesilind (born 1943) — author, photojournalist
Kiino Villand (born 1969) — photographer
Arthur Võõbus (1909–1988) — theologian, orientalist and church historian

Science
Nicole Aunapu Mann (born 1977) — astronaut and test pilot
August Komendant (1906–1992) — Professor of Architecture at University of Pennsylvania (1959–74), Structural Engineer for Louis Kahn
Pearn P. Niiler (1937–2010) — oceanographer
Jaak Panksepp (1943–2017) — neuroscientist and psychobiologist
Hillar Rootare (1928–2008) — physical chemist
Rein Taagepera Ph.D (born 1933) — Research Professor, Political science, University of California, Irvine; Professor Emeritus, University of Tartu, Estonia
Riho Terras (1939–2005) — mathematician
Alar Toomre (born 1937), Jüri Toomre — astronomers and mathematicians
Karen Uhlenbeck (born 1942) — mathematician and founder of geometric analysis
Lauri Vaska (1925–2015) — chemist

Entertainment
Erika Eleniak (born 1969) — Playboy Playmate and actress
Greg Ginn (born 1954) — guitarist of Black Flag
Miliza Korjus (1905–1980) — coloratura soprano opera singer
Karolyn Nelke (born 1948) — stage actress
Mena Suvari (born 1979) — actress (Estonian father)
Ivan Triesault (1898–1980) — actor 
Johann Urb (born 1977) — actor and former model

Sports
Jaan Ehlvest (born 1962) — chess player
Margus Hunt (born 1987) — football player
Chris Jogis (born 1965) — badminton player
Ingrid Neel (born 1998) — tennis player
Michael Roos (born 1982) — football player
John Roosma (1900–1983) — basketball player
Sven Salumaa (born 1966) — tennis player
Warren Cummings Smith (born 1991) — alpine skier
Ralph Tamm (born 1966) — football player
Katie Vesterstein (born 1999) — alpine skier

Business
Elisabeth Murdoch (born 1968) — businesswoman
James Murdoch (born 1972) — businessman
Steve Jurvetson (born 1967) — Draper Fisher Jurvetson businessman

Politics
Michael Josselson (1908–1978) — secretary general for the Congress for Cultural Freedom
Jaan Laaman (born 1948) — leftist extremist
Samuel H. Shapiro (1907–1987) — governor of Illinois.
Edmund S. Valtman (1914–2005) — political cartoonist
Melissa F. Wells (born 1932) — diplomat and former ambassador

Military
Aleksander Einseln (1931–2017) — former Commander-in-chief of the Estonian army (dual U.S. and Estonian citizenship)
Tiiu Kera (born 1945) — retired United States Air Force (USAF) major general
Edward Masso — retired United States Navy Rear Admiral and ambassador to Estonia

References

External links
Estonian American National Council
Estonian Americans

Estonian AMericans
Americans
Estonian